The 1915 Kansas Jayhawks football team was an American football team that represented the University of Kansas as a member of the Missouri Valley Conference (MVC) during the 1915 college football season. In their first season under head coach Herman Olcott, the Jayhawks compiled a 6–2 record (3–1 against conference opponents), finished in second place in the MVC, and outscored opponents by a total of 153 to 79. The Jayhawks played their home games at McCook Field in Lawrence, Kansas. D. S. James was the team captain.

Schedule

References

Kansas
Kansas Jayhawks football seasons
Kansas Jayhawks football